Driesell is a surname. Notable people with the name include:

Chuck Driesell (born 1962), American basketball coach
Lefty Driesell (born 1931), American basketball coach

See also
Drissell